In Carnatic music, Sthai  or Staayi refers to the octave. Madhyama sthai refers to the middle octave, Tara sthai refers to the upper octave and Mandhira sthai refers to the lower octave.

Types
The Five types of Sthai are:

See also
 Sthayi

References 

Carnatic music terminology